Jai Koutrae is an  Australian actor who gained fame for his role as Nathan Chapel  in Death's Requiem, which garnered him an Australian Screen Actors Guild Award. Koutrae has starred in many other successful short and feature films, including Mortal Fools. He has also appeared in many television series such as McLeod's Daughters, All Saints, and Home and Away.

Biography

Early career 
Koutrae's acting career began in 1999, when he was cast in the small role of Rowan Stables on the television show Home and Away. He enjoyed working on the show for a few episodes and decided to audition for the medical show All Saints.

Filmography

References 

1975 births
Australian male television actors
Living people
Australian male film actors
Australian people of English descent